Knutstorp may refer to:

Knutstorp Castle, a castle in southern Sweden
Ring Knutstorp, a motor racing circuit in Sweden